The Southfield Town Center is a cluster of five interconnected skyscrapers forming a contemporary  office complex in the Detroit suburb of Southfield, Michigan. It includes the Westin Southfield Detroit Hotel, restaurants, a fitness center, and a major conference center for up to 1,000 attendees.  This office-hotel complex is situated along Town Center Drive off M-10 (Lodge Freeway), across from Lawrence Technological University in Metro Detroit, with many of its tallest buildings named after their addresses along the road.  Separately, there is a 33-story luxury residential high-rise at 5000 Town Center. The American Center, another 26-story office tower near the confluence of Interstate 696 (I-696) and M-10, is not part of the complex.

The Town Center is across from the Civic Centre, and it is located between West 10 Mile Road and I-696, M-10, and Evergreen Road, as well as being close to the Mixing Bowl.

An enclosed two-story garden atrium connects the hotel with the towers of the Southfield Town Center. The atrium area also contains  of retail space.

History
Planners adapted the Town Center location to avoid protected wetland areas. The original route for the I-696 freeway placed it along 10 Mile Road southeast of 11 Mile and Greenfield Roads. Recognizing the value of a large office complex and its tax revenue, city planners built a new city hall complex near 10 Mile Road on the east side of Evergreen.

Highway planners re-routed the freeway to run along 11 Mile Road.  This delayed construction, but freed up the land to build the first phase, then called the Prudential Town Center (Prudential Life Insurance Company played a major role) with the first skyscraper, 3000 Town Center completed in 1975.  A six-lane freeway ramp nearby remained half-completed for about 10 years in order to modify the route to accommodate the massive Town Center project. Additional towers were constructed in 1979, 1983, 1986, 1987, and 1989.

Location
The Southfield Town Center is located diagonally across Evergreen Road and Civic Center Drive (10 Mile Road) from the complex that houses the Southfield City Hall, government offices, courthouse, the contemporary Southfield Public Library, a 9-hole public golf course, a city park and dedicated sports areas, a nature trail, an historic farm property, and an indoor ice rink / Olympic-size swimming pool and recreation center. Lawrence Technological University is directly across M-10 (Lodge Freeway) from the center.

A variety of contemporary, high-rise office buildings surround the immediate area. Multiple connecting freeways in the vicinity facilitate its central access to the metro region. Residential high-rises and varieties of mid-density housing are within walking distance. The surrounding Southfield area contains single-family homes, many with brick ranch style architecture.

Architecture
The complex is an interconnected cluster of skyscrapers with an ornamental golden glass exterior, each with a different geometric configuration forming a Modern architectural style with Postmodern influences. The Modern styled buildings contain distinctive elements of High-Tech architecture.  The complex contains fine restaurants and gift shops which support its function as a major conference center. Inside, the Westin hotel opens to a large enclosed garden atrium area which connects the Town Center buildings and is available for catering and large events.

Technical details

See also 

American Center
Architecture of metropolitan Detroit
List of tallest buildings in Detroit
List of tallest buildings in Michigan
North Park Towers

Notes

References

External links 
Southfield Town Center web site
 
 
 
 
 
 
 Emporis profile on Southfield Town Center
 Emporis profiles on Town Center towers
 

Skyscrapers in Southfield, Michigan
Office buildings completed in 1989
Prudential Financial buildings
Hotel buildings completed in 1989
Skyscraper office buildings in Michigan
Skyscraper hotels in Michigan